An Ocean in the Air is the second EP of San Francisco-based indie rock band LoveLikeFire.  It was released in 2007. The album received critical praise from Spin magazine.

The music video for the song "I Will" was chosen as an Official Selection of SXSW 2008 Film Festival. The video was shot on 16 mm film and is "carnival-themed".

Track listing 
 "Unlighted Shadow" – 3:03
 "From a Tower" – 4:21
 "Broken Shapes" – 4:21
 "S.O.S." – 3:48
 "Skin & Bones" – 4:36
 "Wish You Dead" – 3:48
 "I Will" – 3:47

References 

2007 EPs
LoveLikeFire albums